The Wheel on the School is a novel by Meindert DeJong, a Dutch-born American, that won the 1955 Newbery Medal for children's literature and the 1957 Deutscher Jugendliteraturpreis. The book was illustrated by noted author and illustrator Maurice Sendak.

Fred Inglis, in his book The Promise of Happiness: Value and Meaning in Children's Fiction, writes that the book invokes the ancient pieties and the values of the old world and makes them "imaginable in the new."

Plot summary
Lina is one of six school children in the small fishing village of Shora. When she writes an essay for school that asks why there are no storks in their village, she sets all the others to wondering. Their teacher encourages the class to find out for themselves. The children set out to bring the storks back. They have to overcome many obstacles. They discovered that the roofs on the village's homes are pitched so steeply that the storks cannot find space to nest on the sharp ridges, and placing a wagon wheel on each roof ridge would give storks a place to nest.  The task of finding a wagon wheel in the tiny village proves difficult, and the children meet several interesting personalities during their search. This simple, yet compelling plot teaches that if people think and wonder why, things will begin to happen and dreams will come true.

The schoolchildren are: Lina, the only girl in the small school; Jella, the biggest of all the children; Auka, an average boy; Eelka, who is fat and awkward; and Pier and Dirk, the inseparable twins. These six kids are aided by their teacher, Grandmother Sibble III, legless Janus, old Douwa, and the "tin man". Other characters include the fathers of the children, who are all fishermen; Lina's aunt, who lives in Nes; Evert, the man living across from Lina's aunt; Lina and Auka's younger siblings, Linda and Jan; Jana, Janus's wife; and the mothers of the children.

The dedication reads: "To my nieces, Shirley and Beverly, and their flying fingers".

See also

References

Newbery Medal–winning works
Books illustrated by Maurice Sendak
1954 American novels
American children's novels
Novels by Meindert DeJong
Novels set in schools
1954 children's books